Jack Irish is an Australian television drama series first broadcast on ABC TV on 14 October 2012. The series stars Guy Pearce as the title character, a former criminal lawyer turned private investigator and debt collector. Much of the action is set in the Melbourne suburb of Fitzroy. Adapted from the crime fiction novels by author Peter Temple, the telemovies and series Jack Irish were developed by Andrew Anastasios, Matt Cameron and Andrew Knight. They began as three feature-length movies, before being adapted into three six-episode series, the final one airing from June 2021.

All three movies were directed by Jeffrey Walker, while Kieran Darcy-Smith serves as lead director on the series. Bad Debts, the first of the three feature-length movies, was watched by an average of 950,000 Australian viewers, ranking as the sixth most watched programme of the week. Black Tide, the second movie, was watched by an average of 851,000 Australian viewers, ranking as the thirteenth most watched programme of the week. Dead Point, the third and final movie, was watched by an average of 780,000 Australian viewers, ranking as the eleventh most watched programme of the week.

The first series of six episodes broadcast from 11 February to 17 March 2016. The second series broadcast from 8 July to 12 August 2018. The second series was dedicated to the memory of Peter Temple, who died in March 2018. The third and final series, Jack Irish: Hell Bent, premiered on ABC TV and ABC iview on 13 June 2021.

Cast

Main
 Guy Pearce as Jack Irish, a criminal defense lawyer turned debt collector and troubleshooter. Jack is still troubled over the murder of his wife by a deranged ex-client. He also works as an apprentice cabinet maker for Charlie Taub.
 Marta Dusseldorp as Linda Hillier, a determined reporter. She starts an on-off romantic relationship with Jack, becoming embroiled with many of Jack's investigations.
 Aaron Pedersen as Cam Delray. Tough, but kind hearted, Cam is Harry Strang's right-hand man and one of Jack's closest friends. Cam often uses his spare time to help Jack out in his cases.
 Roy Billing as Harry Strang, a racing aficionado who often enlists the aid of Jack and Cam.
 Shane Jacobson as Barry Tregear, a gruff, overweight cop who reluctantly helps with Jack's investigations.
 Damien Richardson as Drew Greer, Jack's former law partner who still occasionally assists him in solving cases.

Supporting
 Damien Garvey as Stan (bar owner)
 Terry Norris as Eric
 John Flaus as Wilbur
 Ronald Falk as Norm
 Kate Atkinson as Simone
 Bob Franklin as Brendan O'Grady
 Deborah Mailman as Cynthia
 Vadim Glowna / David Ritchie as Charlie Taub
 Jacek Koman as Orton
 Ivy Mak as Cherry Blossom
 Neil Melville as Ricky Kirsch
 Emma Booth as Isabel Irish

Bad Debts (2012)
 Colin Friels as Garth Bruce
 Nicholas Bell as Martin Scullin
 Steve Bisley as Kevin Pixley
 Tottie Goldsmith as Jackie Pixley
 Colin Hay as Tony Baker
 Fletcher Humphrys as Wayne Milovich
 Alicia Gardiner as Sue McKillop
 Simon Russell as Danny McKillop
 Marshall Napier as Father Gorman

Black Tide (2012)
 Don Hany as Dave
 Diana Glenn as Lyall Cronin
 Martin Sacks as Steve Levesque
 Alexandra Schepisi as Meryl Canetti
 Lachy Hulme as Dean Canetti
 Ronald Jacobson as Des Connors
 Nicholas Coghlan as Gary Connors
 Rhys Muldoon as Rod Pringle

Dead Point (2014)
 Barry Humphries as Justice Loder
 Madeleine Madden as Marie
 Kat Stewart as Ros
 Vince Colosimo as Mike Cundall
 John Jarratt as Senior Sgt Laurie Olsen
 Kate Beahan as Susan Ayliss
 Ben Gerrard as Xavier
 Sarah Roberts as Lorna

Series 1: Blind Faith (2016)
 Claudia Karvan as Sarah Longmore
 Roz Hammond as Sue Shields
 John Bach as Senator Michael Longmore
 Marcus Graham as Rob Shand
 Brooke Satchwell as Tina Longmore
 Peta Brady as Janine Ballich
 Richard Cawthorne as Fraser Boyd
 Robert Morgan as Stedman
 Sacha Horler as Alli Aquaro
 Alvin Anson as Adonis
 Jonicka Movido as Fatma

Series 2: Last Rite (2018)
 Tiarnie Coupland as Gus
 Danielle Cormack as Rory Finch
 Helmut Bakaitis as Thornton Finch
 David Whiteley as Phillip Quinn
 Rubi Balasingam as Lakshmi
 George Zhao as Eddie Chin
 Natalia Novikova as Jaeger
 Don Bridges as Dougie Smalls
 Tony Rickards as Razor Ray

Series 3: Hell Bent (2021)
 Gary Sweet as Det. Phil Maitland
 Alison Whyte as Nina Persky
 Matt Testro as Troy
 Robert Rabiah as Detective Mick Khoury
 Genevieve Picot as Det. Fran Underwood
 Ellen Grimshaw as Casey
 Nicole Nabout as Evie Mansour

Telemovies (2012–2014)

Series

Series 1: Blind Faith (2016)
The first season of Jack Irish takes place in both Australia and the Philippines.

Series 2: Last Rite (2018) 

The second series of Jack Irish was written by Andrew Knight, playwright Matt Cameron, Elise McCredie and Andrew Anastasios, and directed by Mark Joffe, Kriv Stenders and Fiona Banks. A foreign student studying in Australia passes away after she is fatally hit by a bus in Melbourne's CBD. Irish, together with his partner in crime Cam Delray, must investigate the suspicious circumstances surrounding her death, including the potential for a stalker who may have been following her.

Series 3: Hell Bent (2021) 

The third and final series of Jack Irish went to air on ABC TV from Sunday 13 June 2021 at 8:30pm. Striking painfully close to home, Jack's obsession with unlocking the secrets of the past brings him face-to-face with an adversary more personal and destructive than any other he has known.

Viewership
Jack Irish is broadcast every Sunday on ABC TV at 8:30pm, AEST.

Series 1 (2016)

Awards
Jack Irish has been nominated for multiple awards since its initial release to audiences. Pearce was nominated for Best Performance by an Actor in a Mini-Series or Motion Picture Made for Television at the Sichuan TV Festival in 2015 for his portrayal of Jack Irish. Dusseldorp and Mailman were nominated for Best Actress at the Logie Awards in 2017 and 2019 respectively and were both awarded Silver Logies for their performances. Series writer Andrew Knight won the Awgie Award for Television Series or Miniseries of more than 4 hours duration, and was also nominated twice for the Best Television Drama Series as a part of the Australian Academy of Cinema and Television Arts (AACTA) Awards in both 2016 and 2018.

Production 
Production of the Jack Irish series was primarily completed in the Melbourne suburb of Fitzroy, in Australia's state of Victoria. The series was produced by Easy Tiger Productions for ABC in association with Film Victoria and Essential Media & Entertainment. The theme song and music were composed by David McCormack, as well as Antony Partos.

The casting for all three series and telemovies were completed by Natalie Wall, Clare Chapman, Kelly Graham, Fiona McMaster and Pearl Mason-Scott.

References

External links
 ABC television Jack Irish website
 
 
 
 

2010s Australian drama television series
Australian Broadcasting Corporation original programming
2010s Australian crime television series
2012 Australian television series debuts
2021 Australian television series endings
Detective television series
Fitzroy, Victoria
Television shows based on Australian novels